Sangkong is a Loloish language spoken in China by the Hani people in Xiaojie Township 小街乡, Jinghong County. They are called Buxia (布夏) by the local Dai people (Li 2003).

Li (2003) covers the Sangkong dialect of Manwanwa village 曼宛洼寨, Menglong Town 勐龙镇, Jinghong County. It may be the same as the Muda language. You Weiqiong (2013:172) reports that Buxia 布夏 (Sangkong 桑孔) is spoken in 7 villages of Menglong 勐龙.

References

Li, Yongsui. 2003. A study of Sangkong. Beijing: The Nationalities Press.

Southern Loloish languages
Languages of China